The 	Kai monarch (Symposiachrus leucurus), or white-tailed monarch, is a species of bird in the family Monarchidae.
It is endemic to the Kai Islands.
Its natural habitat is subtropical or tropical moist lowland forests.
It is threatened by habitat loss.

Taxonomy and systematics
This species was originally described in the genus Monarcha until moved to Symposiachrus in 2009. Some authorities have considered both the Tanahjampea monarch and the Buru monarch to be subspecies of the white-tailed monarch.

References

Kai monarch
Birds of the Kai Islands
Kai monarch
Kai monarch
Taxonomy articles created by Polbot